William Michael "Bill" O'Dwyer (born January 25, 1960) is an American former professional ice hockey forward who played 120 games in the National Hockey League for the Boston Bruins and Los Angeles Kings between 1983 and 1990. The rest of his career was mainly spent in the minor American Hockey League.

Career statistics

Regular season and playoffs

Awards and honors

References

External links
 

1960 births
Living people
American men's ice hockey centers
Boston Bruins players
Boston College Eagles men's ice hockey players
Ice hockey people from Boston
Los Angeles Kings draft picks
Los Angeles Kings players
Maine Mariners players
New Haven Nighthawks players
Phoenix Roadrunners (IHL) players